Royal Louis was a 110-gun ship of the line of the French Royal Navy. She was designed and built at Brest Dockyard by Léon-Michel Guignace.

Career 
In 1780, Royal Louis was under Beaussier de Chateauvert. She took part in the Battle of Cape Spartel on 20 October 1782 under Beausset, with Verdun de La Crenne as flag captain, although she did not engage.

She was renamed Républicain in September 1792. Under this name, she took part in the Third Battle of Ushant, being the last ship of the French rear. She was attacked, totally dismasted, and struck her colours; however, the British failed to possession, and she returned to Rochefort.

On 24 December 1794, she took part in the Croisière du Grand Hiver. As the fleet exited Brest harbour, she ran aground with the loss of 10 men. Her crew abandoned ship, and the wreck was destroyed in a tempest a few days later.

Sources and references 
 Notes

Citations

References
 
 
 
 
 

Ships of the line of the French Navy
Shipwrecks in the Bay of Biscay
1780 ships
Maritime incidents in 1794